The 1937 Maryland Terrapins football team represented the University of Maryland during the 1937 college football season as a member of the Southern Conference. The highlight of the season was a 13–0 shutout of 17th-ranked Syracuse. In the homecoming game, Charlie Weidinger completed a pass to William Bryant for a 13–7 go-ahead over Florida. The Terrapins' two losses came against Penn and Penn State, the latter being the second game in a rivalry that would bedevil Maryland throughout its entire duration. At the end of the season, Maryland was declared the Southern Conference champions, the team's first major conference title.

Syracuse game and Wilmeth Sidat-Singh
Syracuse and nearby Cornell were among the first collegiate football teams to include African-American players as starting backfield players. Wilmeth Sidat-Singh, starred for Syracuse, playing a position equivalent to modern-day quarterback.

In that era, when games were played in Southern segregation states, African-American players from Northern schools were banned from the field. Because of his light complexion and name, Sidat-Singh was sometimes assumed to be a "Hindu" (as people from India were often called by Americans during this time). However. shortly before a game against Maryland, a black sportswriter, Sam Lacy, wrote an article in the Baltimore Afro-American, revealing Sidat-Singh's was African-American. Maryland refused to let him play and he was held out of the game and Syracuse lost the game 0-13. In a rematch the following year at Syracuse, Sidat-Singh led the Orange to a lopsided victory (53-0) over Maryland.

On Saturday, Nov. 9, 2013, the University of Maryland publicly apologized to surviving relatives at a ceremony during a football game at Syracuse.

References

Maryland
Maryland Terrapins football seasons
Southern Conference football champion seasons
Maryland Terrapins football